The Santana 37 is an American sailboat, that was designed by Gary Mull and first built in 1969. The design is out of production.

Production
The boat was built by W. D. Schock Corporation in the United States, who completed 21 examples between 1969 and 1972.

Design
The Santana 37 is a small recreational keelboat, built predominantly of fiberglass, with wood trim. It has a fractional sloop masthead sloop rig, an internally-mounted spade-type/transom-hung rudder and a fixed fin keel. It displaces  and carries  of ballast.

Variants
Sanatana 37
Standard model.
Sanatana 37 T or TR
This model has a PHRF racing average handicap of 135 with a high of 132 and low of 138.

See also
List of sailing boat types

References

Keelboats
1960s sailboat type designs
Sailing yachts
Sailboat type designs by Gary Mull
Sailboat types built by W. D. Schock Corp